The Neon Demon is a 2016 psychological horror film directed by Nicolas Winding Refn, co-written by Mary Laws, Polly Stenham, and Refn, and starring Elle Fanning. The plot follows an aspiring model in Los Angeles whose beauty and youth generate intense fascination and jealousy within the fashion industry. Supporting roles are played by Karl Glusman, Jena Malone, Bella Heathcote, Abbey Lee, Desmond Harrington, Christina Hendricks, and Keanu Reeves.

An international co-production between France, Denmark, and the United States, the film competed for the Palme d'Or at the 2016 Cannes Film Festival, the third consecutive film directed by Refn to do so, following Drive (2011) and Only God Forgives (2013). In the United States, the film was released theatrically on June 24, 2016 by Amazon Studios and Broad Green Pictures. It opened to polarized reviews, and ultimately grossed a little over $3 million against a $7 million budget.

Plot
Following the death of her parents, sixteen-year-old aspiring model Jesse has just moved from small-town Georgia to Los Angeles. She meets photographer Dean, who does her first shoot, and makeup artist Ruby, who introduces fellow older models Sarah and Gigi, who are interested in her physical appearance and in her sexual experiences, which Jesse feigns to have had.

Jesse is signed by Roberta Hoffman, the owner of a modeling agency, who tells her to pretend she is nineteen and refers her to a test shoot with notable photographer Jack McCarther. The shoot is successful, and Gigi and Sarah envy Jesse's youth. Jesse goes to a casting call for fashion designer Robert Sarno where Sarah is also present. Sarno pays no attention to Sarah but is entranced by Jesse. A distraught Sarah asks her how it feels to be the one everyone admires. Jesse admits, "It's everything," and Sarah lunges toward her, subsequently cutting Jesse's hand on glass. Sarah sucks the blood from Jesse's hand and Jesse rushes back to her motel and faints, hallucinating abstract imagery.

At Sarno's fashion show, Gigi talks to Jesse about cosmetic surgery. As Jesse is closing the show, she hallucinates abstract triangular shapes and reflections of herself. After the show, a visibly changed Jesse goes out with Dean to a bar, where Sarno negatively compares Gigi's surgically enhanced looks to Jesse's natural beauty. Dean finds the conversation unpleasant and attempts to leave with Jesse, who refuses, now espousing a narcissistic persona.

Jesse has a nightmare of being forced by Hank, the lecherous motel owner, to sexually swallow a knife. She wakes up to hear someone fidgeting with her door lock. She quickly turns the deadbolt, but is left to listen as the intruder breaks into the next room and assaults the thirteen-year-old female occupant inside. Terrified, she calls Ruby, who invites Jesse to her home. Ruby makes sexual advances towards Jesse but is rejected by Jesse, who reveals herself to be a virgin. Ruby then leaves for her second job as a cosmetologist at a morgue, where she pleasures herself with a female corpse.

Ruby returns home and finds Jesse now unabashed in her narcissism. Jesse encounters Sarah and Gigi, who along with Ruby chase her and cause her to fall into a deep, empty pool. The women then approach with knives. After they butcher Jesse and consume parts of her body, they all bathe in her blood. Ruby is revealed to have occult tattoos. She lies in Jesse's unmarked grave, and later, nude in her house as a torrent of blood gushes from her genitals.

The next day, Sarah and Gigi attend one of Jack's shoots with another model named Annie. Jack is suddenly enthralled with Sarah and fires Annie. In the midst of the shoot, Gigi runs off set, suddenly ill. Sarah watches Gigi vomit up one of Jesse's eyeballs. She screams with regret, "I need to get her out of me," and stabs herself with a pair of scissors. Sarah watches Gigi die and eats the regurgitated eyeball before returning to the shoot.

The end credits scene shows a woman, who does not show her face, walking alone in the Mojave Desert.

Cast

Production

On October 22, 2013, it was announced that Refn's new film after Only God Forgives would be a Miami- or Tokyo-set "all-female horror" with "lots of sex" called I Walk with the Dead, with Carey Mulligan attached to star and Polly Stenham writing the script. On November 3, 2014, Refn's production company Space Rocket Nation alongside its co-financiers Gaumont Film Company and Wild Bunch announced that Refn's next film would be titled The Neon Demon, to be filmed in Los Angeles in early 2015. Refn commented on the conception of the project: "I woke up one morning a couple of years ago and was like, 'Well, I was never born beautiful, but my wife is,' and I wondered what it had been like going through life with that reality," he says. "I came up with the idea to do a horror film about beauty, not to criticize it or to attack it, but because beauty is a very complex subject. Everyone has an opinion about it."

In January 2015, Dazed reported that the script for the film was inspired by Elizabeth Báthory. In discussing the script, which Refn co-wrote with Mary Laws, he stated: "I decided that I'd made enough films about violent men, and I wanted to do a film with only women in the film, and so I did this story because my wife would only go to L.A. if we had to travel out of Copenhagen. She's like, 'I'm done with Asia. I will only do Los Angeles.' And so I came up with an idea and went to L.A., and I cast this woman called Elle Fanning who is absolutely fantastic, and she played the lead." In subsequent interviews, Refn stated that he visualized the film as an "adult fairy tale."

Casting

On January 6, 2015, Elle Fanning joined the film to play an aspiring model, caught in a world of beauty and demise. Fanning came to Refn's attention because of his wife, who had been impressed by her performance in an earlier film. On January 29, Abbey Lee was added to the cast to play the role of Sarah. On February 5, more cast was added to the film, including Keanu Reeves, Christina Hendricks, Jena Malone and Bella Heathcote. On March 17, 2015, Karl Glusman was set to star in the film. Desmond Harrington was added to the cast on March 30, 2015.

Filming 
Principal photography on the film began in Los Angeles on March 30, 2015. Locations included downtown Los Angeles, while the motel sequences were shot on location at a real motel in Pasadena.

Soundtrack
Composer Cliff Martinez, who collaborated with director Refn on Drive, stated the films have similar styles, musically speaking, noting that for The Neon Demon he sought a "sparse electronic score." He stated in an interview that the first half of the film resembles "a melodrama like Valley of the Dolls, and the second half is like The Texas Chain Saw Massacre." According to Refn and Martinez the soundtrack was influenced by Giorgio Moroder, Goblin, Kraftwerk, Vangelis and Tangerine Dream.

The soundtrack for the film was released on June 24, 2016, physically and through digital download, before being released on vinyl on July 8, 2016, by Milan Records. Sia composed an original song for the film titled "Waving Goodbye". On May 24, 2016, at the Cannes Soundtrack 2016 awards, Cliff Martinez was recognized best composer of the Cannes film festival for his soundtrack to The Neon Demon.

Refn's nephew (and actress Brigitte Nielsen's son) Julian Winding contributed two tracks: "Demon Dance" and "Mine", the latter performed by his band Sweet Tempest.

Release 
In November 2015, Amazon Studios acquired distribution rights to the film in the United States, in partnership with Broad Green Pictures. The Jokers distributed the film in France. Scanbox Entertainment distributed the film in Denmark.

The film had its world premiere at the 2016 Cannes Film Festival on May 20, 2016, before it was released in France on June 8, 2016. The film was then released in Denmark on June 9, followed by the wide release in the United States on June 24, 2016.

The film was released on DVD and Blu-ray on September 27, 2016.

Critical response
The Neon Demon received a mixed response from critics. Much like Refn's previous film, Only God Forgives, the film received both boos and a standing ovation during its premiere at Cannes Film Festival. It holds a 58% approval rating on review aggregator website Rotten Tomatoes, based on 260 reviews, with an average rating of 6/10. The site's consensus reads, "The Neon Demon is seductively stylish, but Nicolas Winding Refn's assured eye can't quite compensate for an underdeveloped plot and thinly written characters." On Metacritic, the film has a score of 51 out of 100, based on 45 critics, indicating "mixed or average reviews".

Writing a four star review in The Guardian, Mark Kermode said it was "a film driven by the same guilty pleasures that have long underpinned Refn's work", and had particular praise for the performance of Malone. Robbie Collin of The Daily Telegraph gave the film five out of five stars, stating, "When the film reaches its logical end point, Refn just keeps pushing, and eventually lands on a sequence so jaw-dropping – almost certainly a sly, glossy-magazine refashioning of Luis Buñuel and Salvador Dali's groundbreaking surrealist short Un Chien Andalou – that all you can do is howl or cheer." Tirdad Derakhshani, writing for The Philadelphia Inquirer, called Refn a "bold visionary artist... able to revel in the culture of instant gratification while also subjecting it to critique", giving the film three and a half out of four stars and calling it a "brutal masterpiece". Rene Rodriguez of The Miami Herald wrote positively of the film's visuals and experimental filmmaking, writing, "To complain that The Neon Demon lacks substance or that it doesn't have anything to say about our cultural obsession with beauty is to miss the crazy, cracked pageant unfolding in front of you. Not all movies are intended to be read like books; some are meant to be experienced," going on to call it a "film that is guaranteed to elicit strong reactions." He awarded the film three out of four stars. The writer Natasha Stagg interpreted the film through René Girard's theory of mimetic desire, and speculated that its box office failure was due to its substance being "too close to its own target".

Owen Gleiberman of Variety gave the film a mixed review: "A horror film is what The Neon Demon is (sort of). It’s set in the Los Angeles fashion world, and it’s the kind of movie in which models look like mannequins that look like slasher-film corpses, and corpses look like love objects. Beauty mingles with mangled flesh, and each fastidiously slick image seems to have come out of Twin Peaks: Fire Walk with Me or The Shining or a very sick version of a Calvin Klein commercial. Every scene, every shot, every line of dialogue, every pause is so hypnotically composed, so luxuriously overdeliberate, that the audience can't help but assume that Refn knows exactly what he's doing – that he's setting us up for the kill. He is, but not if you're on the lookout for a movie that makes sense. (Oh, that.)" Todd McCarthy of The Hollywood Reporter gave the film a negative review and called it "[a] stultifyingly vapid, ponderously paced allegorical critique of the modeling world whose seethingly jealous inhabitants can't wait to literally chew each other up and spit each other out". Glenn Kenny of The New York Times criticized the film as "ridiculous and puerile," and opined, "Mr. Refn composes striking images, but they're all secondhand: faux Fellini, faux David Lynch and so on." The Telegraphs Tim Robey deemed The Neon Demon the "most offensive film of the year," specifically citing its necrophilia sequence as exploitative, though he conceded it is not "any fault of Malone’s, who commits herself utterly to making it an anguished, desperate, if inevitably revolting minute or so of screen time. It’s a question of context, and how this scene – which stands alone, advancing nothing in the overall arc of the story, and is one of very few not to feature Fanning – slots into the film’s overall thesis."

The French film magazine Cahiers du cinéma named The Neon Demon the third-best film of 2016.

References

Sources

External links 
 
 
 
 
 

2016 films
2016 horror films
2016 independent films
2016 LGBT-related films
2016 thriller films
2016 horror thriller films
2010s psychological horror films
Amazon Studios films
American horror thriller films
American independent films
American LGBT-related films
American psychological horror films
Broad Green Pictures films
Danish horror films
Danish independent films
Danish LGBT-related films
Danish thriller films
2010s English-language films
English-language French films
Films about cannibalism
Films about eating disorders
English-language Danish films
Films about modeling
Films about narcissism
Films directed by Nicolas Winding Refn
Films scored by Cliff Martinez
Films set in Los Angeles
Films shot in Los Angeles
French horror thriller films
French independent films
French LGBT-related films
Gaumont Film Company films
LGBT-related horror thriller films
Necrophilia in film
Scanbox Entertainment films
Icon Productions films
2010s American films
2010s French films